Mstislav II Izyaslavich (died 19 August 1170) was the prince of Pereiaslav and Volodymyr and the grand prince of Kiev (Kyiv, 1158-1159, 1167–1169, 1170).

Mstislav was the son of Grand Prince Iziaslav II of Kiev. Along with his father, he participated in the wars against Yury Dolgoruky and the Chernigov princes. After an initial victory against the Cumans in 1153, Mstislav was defeated by the Cumans at the Psyol river. Yury Dolgoruky forced him to flee to Poland in 1155, but the next year Mstislav returned with a new army and defeated Dolgoruky at Volodymyr. Dolgoruky died in 1157, and Mstislav had himself crowned at Volodymyr.

In 1169, Kiev was sacked by Andrey Bogolyubsky who removed Mstislav as grand prince. Mstislav passed his exile in Byzantium and during the reign of Emperor Manuel I Komnenos, was rewarded the district of Otskalana.

In 1151 Mstislav married Agnes, the daughter of Duke Bołeslaw III of Poland. They had three sons:
 Roman, Prince of Novgorod (-1205)
 Sviatoslav, Prince of Brest
 Vsevolod, Prince of Belz, Prince of Volodymyr (died 1196)

His death is reported in 1172 in the book Heraldry of the Royal Families of Europe, Jiri Louda and Michael Maclagan. Clarkson N Potter, New York 1981 in Table 135

References

1172 deaths
Grand Princes of Kiev
Izyaslavichi family (Volhynia)
12th-century princes in Kievan Rus'
Year of birth unknown
Eastern Orthodox monarchs
Hohenstaufen